San Lorenzello is a comune (municipality) in the Province of Benevento in the Italian region Campania, located northeast of Naples and about  northwest of Benevento.

San Lorenzello borders the following municipalities: Castelvenere, Cerreto Sannita, Cusano Mutri, Faicchio, Guardia Sanframondi, San Salvatore Telesino.

Twin towns
 Amaseno, Italy
 Striano, Italy

References

Cities and towns in Campania